The name of the highest mountain in North America became a subject of dispute in 1975, when the Alaska Legislature asked the U.S. federal government to officially change its name from "Mount McKinley" to "Denali.” The mountain had been unofficially named Mount McKinley in 1896 by a gold prospector, and officially by the federal government in 1917 to commemorate William McKinley, who was President of the United States from 1897 until his assassination in 1901.

The name Denali is based on the Koyukon name of the mountain,  ('the high one'). The Koyukon are a people of Alaskan Athabaskans settling in the area north of the mountain.

Alaska in 1975 requested that the mountain be officially recognized as Denali, as it was still the common name used in the state. Attempts by the Alaskan state government to have Mount McKinley's name changed by the federal government were blocked by members of the congressional delegation from Ohio, the home state of the mountain's presidential namesake. In August 2015, Secretary of the Interior Sally Jewell announced that the name would officially be changed in all federal documents. While on an Alaskan visit in the first week of September 2015, President Barack Obama announced the renaming of the mountain.

Historic names

Numerous Indigenous peoples of the area had their own names for this prominent peak. To the South the Dena'ina people in the Susitna River valley used the name  ('the big mountain'), anglicized as Doleika or Traleika, as in Traleika Glacier.

The historical first European sighting of Denali took place on May 6, 1794, when George Vancouver was surveying the Knik Arm of the Cook Inlet and mentioned "distant stupendous mountains" in his journal. However, he uncharacteristically left the mountain unnamed. The mountain is first named on a map by Ferdinand von Wrangel in 1839; the names Tschigmit and Tenada correspond to the locations of Mount Foraker and Denali, respectively. Von Wrangel had been chief administrator of the Russian settlements in North America from 1829 to 1835.

The first English name applied to the peak was Densmore's Mountain or Densmore's Peak, for the gold prospector Frank Densmore, who in 1889 had fervently praised the mountain's majesty; however, the name persevered only locally and informally.

McKinley naming
The mountain was first designated "Mount McKinley" by a New Hampshire-born Seattleite named William Dickey, who led a gold prospectoring dig in the sands of the Susitna River in June 1896. An account written on his return to the contiguous United States appeared in The New York Sun on January 24, 1897, under the title Discoveries in Alaska (1896). Dickey wrote, "We named our great peak Mount McKinley, after William McKinley of Ohio, who had been nominated for the Presidency,  and that fact was the first news we received on our way out of that wonderful wilderness." By most accounts, the naming was politically driven; Dickey had met many silver miners who zealously promoted Democratic presidential candidate William Jennings Bryan's ideal of a silver standard, inspiring him to retaliate by naming the mountain after a strong proponent of the gold standard.

In a United States Geological Survey (USGS) report in 1900, Josiah Edward Spurr refers to "the giant mountain variously known to Americans as Mount Allen, Mount McKinley, or Bulshaia, the latter being a corruption of the Russian adjective meaning big." The 1900 report otherwise calls it Mount McKinley, as does the 1911 USGS report The Mount McKinley Region, Alaska.

McKinley was assassinated early in his second term, shot by Leon Czolgosz on September 6, 1901, and dying of his wounds on September 14. This led to sentiment favoring commemoration of his memory, and the Federal government officially adopted the name Mount McKinley in 1917, when Congress passed and President Woodrow Wilson signed into law "An Act to establish the Mount McKinley National Park in the territory of Alaska" (Public Act No. 353).

Alaska Board of Geographic Names attempts to change name

The mountain was always commonly referred to by its Koyukon Athabaskan name Denali, especially by Alaskans, mountaineers, and Alaska Natives. In 1975, the Alaska Board of Geographic Names changed the name of the mountain to Denali, and, at Governor Jay Hammond's behest, the Alaska Legislature officially requested that the United States Board on Geographic Names (BGN), the federal governmental body responsible for naming geographic features in the United States, change the name of the mountain from "Mount McKinley" to "Mount Denali".

Ohio congressman Ralph Regula (whose district included Canton, where McKinley spent much of his life) opposed action by the U.S. Board and was able to prevent it. At first, the Board consideration was delayed by opposition from Secretary of the Interior Rogers Morton, under whose purview the board fell, as he personally did not favor a change of the mountain's name. Later, in 1977, with Secretary Morton no longer at the helm of the Department of the Interior, the Board again prepared to consider the name change, but Regula gathered signatures from every member of the Ohio congressional delegation against renaming Mount McKinley, and no ruling was made.

On December 2, 1980, with President Jimmy Carter's signing into law of the Alaska National Interest Lands Conservation Act (ANILCA), McKinley National Park—which had been created on February 26, 1917—was incorporated into a larger protected area named Denali National Park and Preserve. Naming the new, larger park Denali, while retaining the name Mount McKinley for the actual mountain was thought to be a compromise by many "Mount McKinley" partisans. However, "Denali" advocates, including Alaska Congressman Don Young, rejected the position that the 1980 action constituted a real compromise, and instead argued that naming the mountain and park by different names only created confusion. While the Board was originally set to make a ruling on December 10, 1980, with the passage of Lands Conservation Act on December 2, they opted to defer their ruling yet again.

The following year, Regula used a procedural maneuver to prevent any change to the Mount McKinley name. Under U.S. Board on Geographic Names policy, the Board cannot consider any name-change proposal if congressional legislation relating to that name is pending. Thus Regula began a biennial legislative tradition of either introducing language into Interior Department appropriation bills, or introducing a stand-alone bill that directed that the name of Mount McKinley should not be changed. This effectively killed the Denali name-change proposal pending with the Board.

Renewed efforts to change name – 2009 to 2015
In 2009, the retirement of Regula reinvigorated interest in renaming the mountain. Alaska State Representative Scott Kawasaki sponsored Alaska House Joint Resolution 15, which urges the U.S. Congress to rename the mountain Denali. Despite efforts in Alaska, Ohio Representatives Betty Sutton and Tim Ryan assumed Regula's role as congressional guardians of the Mount McKinley name and introduced H.R. 229 which reads: "Notwithstanding any other authority of law, the mountain located 63 degrees 04 minutes 12 seconds north, by 151 degrees 00 minutes 18 seconds west shall continue to be named and referred to for all purposes as Mount McKinley."

A January 2015 bill submitted by Alaska Senator Lisa Murkowski once again proposed renaming the peak to Denali. In June 2015 testimony to Congress, the National Park Service's associate director stated that the NPS "has no objection to adopting the name of Denali for Mt. McKinley".

Denali established as official name

On August 30, 2015, Sally Jewell announced that the mountain would be renamed Denali, under authority of federal law which permits her as Secretary of the Interior to name geographic features if the Board on Geographic Names does not act within a "reasonable" period of time. In media interviews, Jewell cited the board's failure to act on the state's four-decade-old request, saying "I think any of us would think that 40 years is an unreasonable amount of time."

Reactions to name change
Ohio Republicans were critical of the renaming. John Boehner, who served as Speaker of the United States House of Representatives and a Representative from Ohio at the time that the name change was announced, said he was "deeply disappointed" by the change, while Regula, who had retired by the time the name change was announced, commented that Obama "thinks he is a dictator". Presidential candidate Donald Trump called the name change a "great insult to Ohio" and vowed to reverse the decision if elected. All 13 Republican members of Ohio's congressional delegation signed a letter of complaint denouncing the "troubling" action of the Obama administration: "William McKinley's legacy has been tarnished by a political stunt." U.S. Representative Mike Turner of Ohio vowed to fight the change: "I'm certain [Obama] didn't notify President McKinley's descendants, who find this outrageous." Not all the state's elected Republicans agreed, however, such as Ohio Secretary of State Jon A. Husted: "I wouldn't want people from Alaska telling me what things in Ohio should be. So I guess we shouldn't tell people from Alaska what they should do in their own state."

In February 2015, in response to the objections from Ohio, Senator Lisa Murkowski of Alaska, a Republican, said: "There's a lot of things in Ohio that are already named after McKinley. This is no affront to our former president; this is all about ensuring that respect for the land and respect for the native people of the region is afforded."

Ohio native and junior Alaska Senator Dan Sullivan, a Republican, said he was "gratified" that President Obama changed the name. Alaska Governor Bill Walker, an independent, said: "Alaska's place names should reflect and respect the rich cultural history of our state, and officially recognizing the name Denali does just that."

On August 30, 2015, speaking from Denali's Ruth Glacier, Senator Murkowski said: "For centuries, Alaskans have known this majestic mountain as the 'Great One'. Today we are honored to be able to officially recognize the mountain as Denali. I'd like to thank the President for working with us to achieve this significant change to show honor, respect and gratitude to the Athabascan people of Alaska."

Obama used the first week of September 2015 on a "climate change-focused" visit, which he also used to announce the renaming of the mountain. On September 6, 2015, former Alaska Governor Sarah Palin criticized Obama's Alaskan visit and also voiced her opposition to the name change: "The name of the national park was changed to Denali some years ago. So I thought that was good enough. We could keep McKinley as the highest peak on the North American continent. We could keep that name McKinley."

After the 2016 presidential election, President Trump and Interior Secretary Ryan Zinke reportedly asked Alaskan senators Dan Sullivan and Lisa Murkowski if they wanted Trump to reverse the name change. The two senators told Trump that they did not want this to happen, and Trump agreed not to reverse the name change.

See also 
Dual naming

References

2015 controversies in the United States
2015 in Alaska
2010s in American politics
Naming dispute
Geographical naming disputes
Legal history of Alaska
Native American history of Alaska
Political controversies in the United States
Political history of Alaska
Politics of Ohio
William McKinley